Entalophora is a genus of bryozoans belonging to the family Entalophoridae.

The genus has cosmopolitan distribution.

Species

Species:

Entalophora africana 
Entalophora airensis 
Entalophora alexeevi

References

Bryozoan genera